Levi J. Gunn (June 2, 1830 – September 9, 1916) was an American manufacturer and politician who was one of the founders of the Millers Falls Company, a member of the Massachusetts Senate and in the  Massachusetts Executive Council.

See also
 106th Massachusetts General Court (1885)

References

External links
 

  

1830 births
People from Conway, Massachusetts
Members of the Massachusetts Governor's Council
Massachusetts state senators
1916 deaths
19th-century American politicians